Vitali Aleksandrovich Veselov (born 13 August 1973) is a former Russian professional football player.

Honours
 Russian Premier League bronze: 1998
 Russian Cup winner: 1996, 1997
 Russian Cup finalist: 1998

European club competitions
With FC Lokomotiv Moscow

 1996–97 UEFA Cup Winners' Cup: 2 games
 1997–98 UEFA Cup Winners' Cup: 4 games

External links
 

1973 births
Footballers from Moscow
Living people
Russian footballers
Association football forwards
FC Lokomotiv Moscow players
PFC Spartak Nalchik players
FC Moscow players
FC Saturn Ramenskoye players
FC Arsenal Tula players
Russian Premier League players